Cain is the surname of:

 Arthur Cain (1921–1999), British evolutionary biologist and ecologist
 Bill Cain (born late 1950s), American playwright and Jesuit priest
 Bill Cain (athletic director) (born 1933), American college football player and athletic director
 Carl Cain (born 1934), American basketball player
 Chris Cain (born 1955), jazz and blues guitarist
 D. Jamison Cain (1926–2010), American government official
 Dean Cain (born 1966), American actor
 Deon Cain (born 1996), American football player
 Elizabeth Cain (born 1962), Australian ice skater
 Henri Caïn (1857–1937), French playwright and librettist
 Herb Cain (1913–1982), Canadian professional ice hockey player
 Herman Cain (1945–2020), American businessman, talk show host, and candidate for the 2012 Republican presidential nomination
 Jackie Cain (1928–2014), American jazz vocalist
 James M. Cain (1892–1977), American crime writer
 John Cain (disambiguation), multiple people with the name John Cain including two former premiers of Victoria
 Johnny Cain (1908–1977), American football player, college sports coach, and administrator
 Jonathan Cain (born 1950), musician
 LeRoy E. Cain (born 1964), American aerospace engineer who worked for NASA
 Lorenzo Cain  (born 1986), American baseball center fielder
 Matt Cain (born 1984), American baseball pitcher 
 Matt Cain (writer), British writer and broadcaster
 Michael Cain (born 1966), American pianist and composer
 Michael Cain (footballer) (born 1994), English footballer
 Mick Cain (1885–1951), New Zealand rugby union player
 Myrtle Cain (1894–1980), American politician
 Nyoshia Cain (born 1994), Trinidad and Tobago Paralympic athlete
 Patrick Cain (born 1962), American football player
 Paul Cain (author) (1928–1966), American writer
 Paul Cain (minister) (1929–2019), American Pentecostal minister
 Randy Cain (1945–2009), American soul singer, member of the vocal group The Delfonics
 Robert Henry Cain (1909–1974), British soldier, recipient of the Victoria Cross
 Roy Franklin Cain (born 1906), Canadian bryologist and mycologist - see Coniochaetaceae
 Stanley A. Cain (1902–1995), American botanist and plant ecologist
 Stephen Cain (born 1984), Australian decathlete  - see List of decathlon national champions (men)
 Susan Cain (born 1968), American non-fiction writer and lecturer
 Syd Cain (1918–2011), British production designer
 Tim Cain, American video game programmer
 Tyler Cain (born 1988), American basketball player

See also
 Caine (surname)
 Kain (surname)
 Kane (surname)
 Cayne (disambiguation)

English-language surnames